HY Velorum is a binary star system in the southern constellation of Vela. It is a dim star but visible to the naked eye with an apparent visual magnitude of 4.83. HY Vel most likely forms a gravitationally bound pair with the magnitude 5.45 binary system KT Vel (HD 74535); both are members of the IC 2391 open cluster. As of 1998, HY Vel and KT Vel had an angular separation of  along a position angle of 311°.

This is a single-lined spectroscopic binary system with an orbital period of 8.4 days and an eccentricity of 0.24.

The primary  is a slowly pulsating B-type star having at least three pulsational modes, with the dominant mode showing a frequency of 0.64472 cycles per day, corresponding to the catalogued period of 1.55106 days. It has a stellar classification of B3 IV, matching a B-type subgiant star.

References

B-type subgiants
Slowly pulsating B stars
Vela (constellation)
074560
042726
3467
Velorum, HY
Spectroscopic binaries
Durchmusterung objects